Rozafa Castle, also known as the Shkodër Castle is a castle near the city of Shkodër, in northwestern Albania. Shkodër is the seat of Shkodër County, and is one of Albania's oldest and most historic towns, as well as an important cultural and economic centre.

History

Antiquity
Due to its strategic location, the hill has been settled since antiquity. It was an Illyrian stronghold during the rule of the Labeates and Ardiaei, whose capital was Scodra.

During the Third Illyrian War the Illyrian king Gentius concentrated his forces in Scodra. When he was attacked by the Roman army led by L. Anicius Gallus, Gentius fled into the city and was trapped there hoping that his brother Caravantius would come at any moment with a large relieving army, but it didn't happen. After his defeat, Gentius sent two prominent tribal leaders, Teuticus and Bellus, as envoys to negotiate with the Roman commander. On the third day of the truce, Gentius surrendered to the Romans, was placed in custody and sent to Rome. The Roman army marched north of Scutari Lake where, at Meteon, they captured Gentius' wife queen Etuta, his brother Caravantius, his sons Scerdilaidas and Pleuratus along with leading Illyrians.

The fall of the Ardiaean Kingdom in 168 BC is transmitted by Livy in a ceremonial manner of the triumph of Anicius in Rome:

Medieval and Ottoman period
The 19th-century German author and explorer Johann Georg von Hahn suggested that the ancient and medieval city of Shkodër was located immediately south of the Rozafa hill, between the hill and the confluence of Buna and Drin. The fortifications, as they have been preserved to date, are mostly of Venetian origin.

Within the Castle there are the ruins of a 13th-century Venetian Catholic church, considered by scholars as the St. Stephen's Cathedral, which after the siege of Shkodër in the 15th century, when the Ottoman Empire captured the city, was transformed into the Fatih Sultan Mehmet Mosque.

The castle has been the site of several famous sieges, including the siege of Shkodër of 1478-79 and the siege of Shkodër of 1912-13. The castle and its surroundings form an Archaeological Park of Albania.

Legend

A famous widespread legend about sacrificing a female victim and immurement with the aim of building a facility is traditionally orally transmitted by Albanians and connected with the construction of the Rozafa Castle.

The story tells about the initiative of three brothers who set down to build a castle. They worked all day, but the foundation walls fell down at night. They met a wise old man who seems to know the solution of the problem asking them if they were married. When the three brothers responded positively, the old man said:

The three brothers swore on besa to not speak with their wives of that happened. However the two eldest brothers broke their promise and quietly told their wives everything, while the honest youngest brother kept his besa and said nothing. The mother of the three brothers knew nothing of their agreement, and while the next afternoon at lunch time, she asked her daughters-in-law to bring lunch to the workers, two of them refused with an excuse. The brothers waited anxiously to see which wife was carrying the basket of food. It was Rozafa, the wife of the youngest brother, who left her younger son at home. Embittered, the youngest brother explained to her what the deal was, that she was to be sacrificed and buried in the wall of the castle so that they could finish building it, and she didn't protest but, worried about her infant son, she accepted being immured and made a request:

A well known version of the legend is the Serbian epic poem called The Building of Skadar (Зидање Скадра, Zidanje Skadra) published by Vuk Karadžić, after he recorded a folk song sung by a Herzegovinian storyteller named Old Rashko. The version of the song in the Serbian language  is the oldest collected version of the legend, and the first one which earned literary fame. The three brothers in the legend were represented by members of the nobel Mrnjavčević family, Vukašin, Uglješa and Gojko. Furthermore, Dundes states that the name Gojko is invented. In 1824, Karadžić sent a copy of his folksong collection to Jacob Grimm, who was particularly enthralled by the poem. Grimm translated it into German, and described it as "one of the most touching poems of all nations and all times". Johann Wolfgang von Goethe published the German translation, but did not share Grimm's opinion because he found the poem's spirit "superstitiously barbaric". Alan Dundes, a famous folklorist, noted that Grimm's opinion prevailed and that the ballad continued to be admired by generations of folksingers and ballad scholars.

Tourism

Gallery

See also

Albanian mythology
Constantin and Doruntine
Tourism in Albania

References

Sources

 

.

Castles in Albania
Buildings and structures in Shkodër
Illyrian architecture
Tourist attractions in Shkodër County